Ivan Parlov (born 3 April 1984) is a Croatian retired football midfielder.

Career
Parlov had spells abroad in Iceland with Fram Reykjavík and in Austria with Mattersburg and in the lower leagues.

References

External links
 

1984 births
Living people
Footballers from Zagreb
Association football midfielders
Croatian footballers
Croatia youth international footballers
Croatia under-21 international footballers
NK Hrvatski Dragovoljac players
GNK Dinamo Zagreb players
HNK Segesta players
NK Zagreb players
SV Mattersburg players
Apollon Limassol FC players
NK Slaven Belupo players
NK Inter Zaprešić players
Knattspyrnufélagið Fram players
Croatian Football League players
Austrian Football Bundesliga players
Cypriot First Division players
1. deild karla players
Austrian 2. Landesliga players
Croatian expatriate footballers
Expatriate footballers in Austria
Expatriate footballers in Cyprus
Expatriate footballers in Iceland
Croatian expatriate sportspeople in Austria
Croatian expatriate sportspeople in Cyprus
Croatian expatriate sportspeople in Iceland